Fernando Martínez Rubio (born 10 June 1990), known simply as Fernando, is a Spanish professional footballer who plays for UD Almería as a goalkeeper.

Club career

Early career
Born in Murcia, Fernando finished his development in Valencia CF's youth system. He made his senior debut with Sangonera Atlético CF, spending one season in the Segunda División B.

Murcia
Fernando joined Real Murcia in the summer of 2010, playing two years with the reserves in the Tercera División. In August 2012, he was loaned to neighbouring UCAM Murcia CF in the third division.

Fernando made his official debut for Murcia on 11 September 2013, in a 2–0 away loss against Hércules CF in the second round of the Copa del Rey. His Segunda División bow occurred on 24 November, as he replaced field player Daniel Toribio after Casto was sent off in the 70th minute, and kept a clean sheet in the 0–0 draw at AD Alcorcón.

UCAM Murcia
On 5 July 2016, Fernando returned to UCAM Murcia, newly promoted to the second tier. A backup to Biel Ribas, he featured in 12 league matches as his team suffered relegation.

Almería
On 5 July 2017, Fernando signed a two-year contract with fellow second-division club UD Almería. Second-choice to René, he renewed his contract with the Rojiblancos for a further two seasons on 22 May 2019. 

Fernando became a regular starter under new manager Guti, and agreed to a further extension until 2022 on 27 April 2020. He only missed one game in 42 in the 2021–22 campaign, and Almería returned to La Liga after seven years as champions; in the process, he was awarded the Ricardo Zamora Trophy. 

Fernando made his Spanish top-flight debut on 14 August 2022 at the age of 32, in a 1–2 home loss to Real Madrid. The following 19 January, he again renewed his link with the Andalusians, now until 2025.

Honours
Almería
Segunda División: 2021–22

References

External links

1990 births
Living people
Spanish footballers
Footballers from Murcia
Association football goalkeepers
La Liga players
Segunda División players
Segunda División B players
Tercera División players
Real Murcia Imperial players
Real Murcia players
UCAM Murcia CF players
UD Almería players
Spain youth international footballers